Betrequia is a genus of horse flies in the family Tabanidae.

Distribution
Brazil.

Species
Betrequia ocellata Oldroyd, 1970

References

Brachycera genera
Tabanidae
Diptera of South America
Fauna of Brazil
Taxa named by Harold Oldroyd